"Nada Nuevo" (English: "Nothing New") is a song by Mexican singer-songwriter Christian Nodal released on February 14, 2019 as a single. "Nada Nuevo" was witten by Nodal and American songwriter and producer Edgar Barrera.

"Nada Nuevo" reached number one on the Top 20 General Mexican Songs Chart and number twenty six on the Billboard Top Latin Songs chart in the United States.

Charts

Year-end charts

Certifications

See also
List of number-one songs of 2019 (Mexico)

References

2019 songs
2019 singles
Mexican folk songs
Ranchera songs
Spanish-language songs
Universal Music Latin Entertainment singles
Monitor Latino Top General number-one singles
Christian Nodal songs
Songs written by Edgar Barrera
Songs written by Christian Nodal